Plaine Des Gaiacs Airfield is a former World War II airfield on New Caledonia in the South Pacific. It is located at Plaine Des Gaiacs near the village of Pouembout. The airfield was also known as De Gaiacs and was named for the Gaiac tree that grow in the area.

After being used as a wartime airfield, it was abandoned and today is almost totally returned to its natural state.

History
Plaine Des Gaiacs Airfield was built in the 1930s by the French colonists.   After the fall of France in 1940, the Free French took control of the field.  The airfield was expanded into two massive sealed runways by the US Army.  It was initially used as a command and control base, then later becoming a staging and training base for aircraft bound for Australia or north to the New Hebrides combat zones.

USAAF units assigned were:

 13th Troop Carrier Squadron, 9 October 1942 - 17 December 1942
 Headquarters, Thirteenth Air Force, 13–21 January 1943
 Headquarters, XIII Fighter Command, 13–22 January 1943
 11th Bombardment Group (Heavy), 22 July 1942 - 23 November 1942
 42d Bombardment Group (Medium), 20 October 1943 - 20 January 1944
 347th Fighter Group, 3 October 1943 - 29 December 1943
 4th Reconnaissance Group, 22 November 1942 - 23 January 1943

The Royal New Zealand Air Force No. 9 Squadron operating Lockheed Hudson was based at Plaine Des Gaiacs from July 1942 until March 1943.

Postwar
The airfield was closed after the war and fell into disuse.  Today it is overgrown with vegetation; the runways are still visible from the air and many small traces of the American occupation remain, such as fuel drums, metal, etc.

See also

 USAAF in the South Pacific
Naval Base Nepoui

References

 Maurer, Maurer (1983). Air Force Combat Units Of World War II. Maxwell AFB, Alabama: Office of Air Force History. .
 www.pacificwrecks.com

External links
 Website for the airfield

Airfields of the United States Army Air Forces Air Transport Command in the Pacific Ocean Theater
Airfields of the United States Army Air Forces in the Pacific Ocean theatre of World War II